Myfanwy Warhurst (born May 29, 1973) is an Australian radio announcer and television personality, best known for her work at Triple J radio station and on ABC Television's long-running music-themed quiz show Spicks and Specks.  she has an ongoing role as Australia's commentator for the Eurovision Song Contest alongside Joel Creasey, and as co-host of the weekly podcast Bang On. She also provides the voices of Aunt Trixie and Indy's Mum in the Australian animated show Bluey.

Early life 
Warhurst was born in Portland, Victoria, in 1973. She has three older brothers named Kit and Andre. Kit plays drums in the band Rocket Science. Warhurst's family moved to Donald in central Victoria when she was a child, then to Red Cliffs in northwest Victoria when she was eight years old.

Career 
Before her career as a radio announcer and TV personality, Warhurst was editor-in-chief of Melbourne street press Inpress.

Radio and podcasting
Working as a radio announcer at Triple J, Warhurst came to the attention of the station's audience through short bi-weekly segments for Merrick and Rosso's Drive program in 2000. In 2001, Warhurst began hosting the Net 50 request program on Saturday nights, and in 2003, came to prominence as host of the weekday Lunch shift and her daily segment The Trashy Lunchtime Quiz. In January 2007 she joined Jay and the Doctor in hosting The Breakfast Show as Myf, Jay and the Doctor.

It was announced on 10 October 2007 that she would leave Triple J and co-host a new breakfast show with comedian Peter Helliar and take over the Triple M Melbourne breakfast spot from The Cage, who finished up in November 2007.

Warhurst is co-host, with Zan Rowe, of the weekly podcast Bang On, "about music, art, life and stuff".

Television 
Warhurst's television work has included hosting jtv, the December 2006 special My Favourite Album, and captaining a team on Spicks and Specks from its inception in 2005 until it finished in 2011. When finishing Spicks and Specks, Warhurst said "I've been lucky enough to experience many great things. I've seen Frank Woodley's privates, been naked under a desk with Pete Murray, and met many of my childhood musical crushes. Life can't get much better than that, so this seems like the perfect time to wind things up." Worst moments included her embarrassment at not being able to recall the name of Nirvana's "Smells Like Teen Spirit" upon hearing it.

She is  a regular presenter on The Project.

Warhurst returned to ABC1 in June 2012 with a six-part series, Myf Warhurst's Nice.

In 2017, Warhurst, along with Joel Creasey, was announced as one of Australia's commentators for the Eurovision Song Contest. Warhurst also appeared as a guest quiz master on Have You Been Paying Attention?.

In 2018, she started providing the voice for the animated character of Aunt Trixie and Indy's Mum, in the ABC Kids television program Bluey.

Guest appearances
Warhurst has occasionally appeared on Rove, and was a special presenter on RMITV's The Loft Live.

In January 2020, Warhurst participated in the sixth season of the Australian version of I'm a Celebrity...Get Me Out of Here!.

She was the focus of the second episode of season 13 of the Australian version of Who Do You Think You Are?, first aired on 28 June 2022.

In August 2022, Warhurst was interviewed by Virginia Trioli on radio, in which she talked about receiving training to become a foster parent.

In October 2022, she appeared on Fran Kelly's TV show Frankly.

Awards
Spicks and Specks twice won the Logies' Most Outstanding Light Entertainment Program.

The irreverent TV Fugly Awards (in its "Good Categories") awarded Warhurst as their Most Spankable Female TV Personality in 2007 & 2008.

References

External links 

 Myf Warhurst's page (archived 2009 on the old Spicks & Specks website)

1973 births
Living people
Australian people of Welsh descent
Australian television personalities
Women television personalities
Australian women television presenters
Triple J announcers
People from Portland, Victoria
Australian radio presenters
Australian women radio presenters
Radio personalities from Melbourne
I'm a Celebrity...Get Me Out of Here! (Australian TV series) participants
Eurovision commentators